Zanclognatha jacchusalis bryanti is a moth of the family Noctuidae. It was described by William Barnes in 1928. It is found from British Columbia to Oregon.

Taxonomy
The classification of this species was unclear for a long time. Some authors considered it a subspecies of Zanclognatha ochreipennis. It has also been treated as a synonym of Zanclognatha jacchusalis or a subspecies of Zanclognatha lutalba.

External links

bryanti
Moths of North America
Moths described in 1928